Mystic class is a class of Deep-Submergence Rescue Vehicles (DSRVs), designed for rescue operations on submerged, disabled submarines of the United States Navy or foreign navies. The two submarines of the class were never used for this purpose, and were replaced by the Submarine Rescue Diving Recompression System.

Features
DSRVs are designed for quick deployment in the event of a submarine accident. DSRVs are transportable by truck, aircraft, ship, or by specially configured attack submarine. At the accident site, the DSRV works with either a "mother ship" or "mother submarine". The DSRV dives, conducts a sonar search, and attaches to the disabled submarine's hatch. DSRVs can embark up to 24 persons for transfer to the mother vessel.

The DSRV also has an arm to clear hatches on a disabled submarine and a combined gripper and cable cutter. The gripper is able to lift 1,000 pounds (450 kg).

Background

The Deep Submergence System Project was established in June 1965 in the aftermath of the loss of  USS Thresher in 1963.

At the time, submarine operating depths greatly exceeded the capabilities of rescue vessels. Lockheed Missiles and Space Company was contracted to produce a deep diving rescue submarine. In an effort to win the design and construction contracts for a DSRV, the company built Deep Quest prototype. She was launched in June 1967; in March 1970, she was used to find a US Navy Grumman F6F-3 Hellcat which had crashed on 12 January 1944, in the ocean near Naval Air Station San Diego.

The first DSRV was launched in 1970. While it has been alleged that the stated goal of the DSRV project was unrealistic, and that it was a front for research on undersea espionage, including cable tapping, the DSRVs have a demonstrated rescue capability, and have conducted numerous practice rescue missions.

DSRV-1 was launched in San Diego, California, on 24 January 1970.  Testing culminated in an operational evaluation that saw a complete, simulated submarine rescue mission.  DSRV-1 was named Mystic during Fleet Acceptance Ceremonies in 1977.

The second, and final, vessel in the class, DSRV-2, was subsequently launched and named Avalon.

General characteristics

List of vessels

See also
 List of submarine classes in service
 Bathyscaphe

References

External links
USN Fact File

Submarine classes
 
 Mystic class
Lifeboats
Lockheed Corporation
Auxiliary search and rescue ship classes